Martin County is a county in Minnesota, United States. As of the 2020 census, the population was 20,025. Its county seat is Fairmont.

History
The county was created by the Minnesota Territory legislature on May 23, 1857, with Fair Mount (which was also platted in 1857) designated as county seat. The town's name was later shortened to Fairmont. Two explanations have been advanced for the county's name. A delegate to the US Congress from the Wisconsin Territory, Morgan Lewis Martin, introduced the legislative act to organize the Minnesota Territory. But in 1904 the county's oldest residents attested that the name referred to Henry Martin, an early settler from Connecticut who ran several businesses during the pre-territory era.

Geography
Martin County lies on Minnesota's border with Iowa. The East Fork of the Des Moines River flows southeastward through the lower western part of the county. The county terrain consists of low rolling hills, dotted with lakes and ponds, completely devoted to agriculture where possible. The terrain slopes to the east and north, with its highest point near its southwest corner, at 1,407' (429m) ASL.

Major highways

  Interstate 90
  Minnesota State Highway 4
  Minnesota State Highway 15
  Minnesota State Highway 263

Airports
 Fairmont Municipal Airport (FRM)

Adjacent counties

 Watonwan County - north
 Blue Earth County - northeast
 Faribault County - east
 Kossuth County, Iowa - southeast
 Emmet County, Iowa - southwest
 Jackson County - west

Protected areas

 Ceylon State Wildlife Management Area
 Fox Lake Refuge
 Luedtke State Wildlife Management Area
 Perch Creek State Wildlife Management Area
 State Wildlife Management Area
 Truman Wildlife Area

Lakes

 Amber Lake
 Big Twin Lake
 Bright Lake
 Budd Lake
 Buffalo Lake (Cedar Township)
 Buffalo Lake (Rutland Township)
 Canright Lake
 Cedar Lake
 Clam Lake
 Clayton Lake
 Clear Lake
 Creek Lake
 Eagle Lake
 East Chain Lake
 Fish Lake (Cedar Township)
 Fish Lake (Lake Belt Township)
 Fox Lake
 Hall Lake
 High Lake
 Iowa Lake (part)
 Kiester Lake
 Lake Charlotte
 Lake George
 Lake Imogene
 Lake Seymour
 Little Hat Lake
 Little Twin Lake
 Martin Lake
 Mud Lake
 Murphy Lake
 North Lake
 North Silver Lake
 Okamanpeedan Lake (part)
 Perch Lake
 Pierce Lake
 Rose Lake
 Round Lake (Fox Lake Township)
 Round Lake (Waverly Township)
 Sager Lakes
 Sisseton Lake
 South Silver Lake
 Susan Lake
 Temperance Lake
 Tuttle Lake
 Watkins Lake
 Wilmert Lake

Demographics

2000 census

As of the 2000 census, there were 21,802 people, 9,067 households, and 6,047 families in the county. The population density was 30.6/sqmi (11.8/km2). There were 9,800 housing units at an average density of 13.8/sqmi (5.31/km2). The racial makeup of the county was 97.22% White, 0.25% Black or African American, 0.10% Native American, 0.42% Asian, 0.02% Pacific Islander, 1.26% from other races, and 0.73% from two or more races. 1.93% of the population were Hispanic or Latino of any race. 51.6% were of German, 11.9% Norwegian, 5.9% Swedish and 5.0% English ancestry.

There were 9,067 households, out of which 29.80% had children under the age of 18 living with them, 56.60% were married couples living together, 7.20% had a female householder with no husband present, and 33.30% were non-families. 30.00% of all households were made up of individuals, and 15.20% had someone living alone who was 65 years of age or older. The average household size was 2.35 and the average family size was 2.92.

The county population contained 24.80% under the age of 18, 6.40% from 18 to 24, 24.90% from 25 to 44, 24.00% from 45 to 64, and 19.90% who were 65 years of age or older. The median age was 42 years. For every 100 females there were 95.30 males. For every 100 females age 18 and over, there were 91.50 males.

The median income for a household in the county was $34,810, and the median income for a family was $44,541. Males had a median income of $30,467 versus $21,780 for females. The per capita income for the county was $18,529. About 7.10% of families and 10.50% of the population were below the poverty line, including 15.10% of those under age 18 and 9.00% of those age 65 or over.

2020 Census

Communities

Cities

 Ceylon
 Dunnell
 Fairmont (county seat)
 Granada
 Northrop
 Ormsby (part)
 Sherburn
 Trimont
 Truman
 Welcome

Unincorporated communities

 East Chain
 Fox Lake
 Imogene
 Nashville Center
 Wilbert

Townships

 Cedar Township
 Center Creek Township
 East Chain Township
 Elm Creek Township
 Fairmont Township
 Fox Lake Township
 Fraser Township
 Galena Township
 Jay Township
 Lake Belt Township
 Lake Fremont Township
 Manyaska Township
 Nashville Township
 Pleasant Prairie Township
 Rolling Green Township
 Rutland Township
 Silver Lake Township
 Tenhassen Township
 Waverly Township
 Westford Township

Government and politics
Martin County voters have been reliably Republican for decades. As of 2020, the county has selected the Democratic presidential nominee in only one election since 1952.

See also
 National Register of Historic Places listings in Martin County, Minnesota

References

Further reading
 William H. Budd, History of Martin County: A True and Complete History of the County from its Earliest Settlement Down to 1880. Fairmont, MN: The Independent, 1897.
 Roscoe C. Hunt, "Pioneer Physicians of Martin County Prior to 1900," Minnesota Medicine, vol. 25, no. 10 (Oct. 1942) and vol. 25, no. 11 (Nov. 1942).
 Ray F. Kesler, Service Record Book of Men and Women of World War II, Martin County. Fairmont, MN: n.p., n.d. [1950s].
 Martin County Historical Society, Martin County, 1857-1932: Diamond Jubilee Celebration and Homecoming, Fairmont, Minnesota, June 26 to July 4, 1932. Fairmont, MN: Martin County Historical Society, 1932.
 Martin County Home Council, Martin County's Heritage. Fairmont, MN.: Martin County Extension Home Council, 1972–1976.
 Allen L Moore, Historical Narrative of Martin County, Before 1850. Fairmont, MN: Martin County Historical Society, 1932.
 Arthur M. Nelson, Know Your Own County: A History of Martin County, Minnesota. Fairmont, MN: Martin County Historical Society, 1947.
 Arthur M. Nelson, Martin County Men in the Great War, 1917-1919. Fairmont, MN: Sentinel Publishing Co., 1920.
 Sentinel, A Pictorial History of Martin County, MN. Marceline, MO: Heritage House, 1992.

External links
 Martin County government’s website

 
Minnesota counties
1857 establishments in Minnesota Territory
Populated places established in 1857